One of 18 colleges and schools at the University of Texas in Austin, Texas, the College of Education provides a variety of academic degrees in education fields, as well as certification programs at all levels.  It has consistently ranked among the top public university graduate education programs by U.S. News & World Report. The 2014 edition of "America's Best Graduate Schools" ranks the College of Education fourth behind Vanderbilt University, Johns Hopkins University, and Harvard University. The College employs 105 full-time tenured/tenure track professors and 84 non-tenure track.

History
Founded in 1891 as the School of Pedagogy, the College of Education has a legacy of helping to determine the role of the university in teacher education. Joseph Baldwin, a leader in state and national education associations, was appointed the first professor of pedagogy by the University of Texas Board of Regents on August 25, 1891. The current College of Education was established in 1905, with five departments, three centers, two offices, and one laboratory.

Past and Present Deans
 William S. Sutton, 1909-1926
 B.F. Pittinger, 1926-1946
 Clarence T. Gray, Acting Dean, 1946
 Laurence D. Haskew, 1947-1961
 Clyde Colvert, 1962-1963
 Wayne H. Holtzman, 1964-1969
 Lorrin Kennamer, 1970-1986
 Waneen Spirduso, Interim Dean, 1987-1989
 Manuel Justiz, 1990-2017
 Sherry Field, Interim Dean, 2018
 Charles R. Martinez Jr., 2019–present

Degree Programs
The College of Education offers three Undergraduate Degree Programs related to health, education, and the business of culture, sport, and entertainment industries:

 Bachelor of Science in Applied Learning and Development (ALD)
 Bachelor of Science in Athletic Training
 Bachelor of Science in Kinesiology and Health Education (KHE)

The Graduate Programs offered by the College of Education include master, doctoral, and certification programs that are managed by each of our five departments in concert with the Graduate School at the University of Texas at Austin. These programs offer research-driven experiences that pair theory and practice in collaborative environments and programs that may lead to a recommendation for teacher certification (the M.Ed.+).

Diversity and Inclusion

Diversity and inclusion have long been core values of the College of Education. In May 2019, Dean Charles R. Martinez Jr. named Professor Richard Reddick the inaugural dean for equity, community, engagement, and outreach. In this role, Reddick provides leadership and focus to support the college’s continued commitment to advancing a culture of social justice, equity, diversity, and inclusion.

Program Rankings
For more than 20 years, the College of Education has been ranked by U.S. News & World Report as one of the best colleges of education in the country. In the 2021 edition, the college was ranked 15th overall.

College programs have been ranked highly in the following categories:
 Curriculum and Instruction
 Educational Administration and Supervision
 Educational Psychology
 Education Policy
 Elementary Teacher Education
 Higher Education Administration
 Secondary Teacher Education
 Special Education

As of 2020, the Department of Kinesiology and Health Education is ranked second by the National Academy of Kinesiology.

Facilities 

Administrative offices and classrooms for The College of Education are housed in the George I. Sánchez Building (SZB) and L. Theo Bellmont Hall (BEL). SZB is named after American education pioneer and civil rights activist George Isidore Sánchez, who earned a master's degree in Educational Psychology and Spanish at the University of Texas.   The building is located four blocks north of the Texas Capitol at the intersection of Martin Luther King Jr. Boulevard and Speedway, adjacent to the Blanton Museum of Art, across from Jester Student Housing, and in back of the Perry–Castañeda Library on the University of Texas at Austin campus. BEL is located on the west side of Darrell K Royal-Texas Memorial Stadium facing San Jacinto Blvd. BEL is named for a former athletic director at The University of Texas at Austin.

References

University of Texas at Austin schools, colleges, and departments
1905 establishments in Texas